Get What You Give is the third studio album by metalcore band The Ghost Inside, released on June 19, 2012. It is dedicated, in the inner CD case, to the memory of Ryan Vigil, brother of vocalist Jonathan Vigil.

Get What You Give checked in at No. 3 on Australian hardcore radio station, short.fast.loud's, Best Album of 2012 listener poll, behind Australian artists Parkway Drive and The Amity Affliction.

The video for the single, "Engine 45", was released on June 5, 2012.

The album artwork features Rundle Mountain in Banff National Park, Canada.

Track listing

Personnel

The Ghost Inside
 Jonathan Vigil – lead vocals
 Aaron Brooks – lead guitar, backing vocals
 Jim Riley – bass, backing vocals
 Zach Johnson – rhythm guitar
 Andrew Tkaczyk – drums

Additional musicians
 Jeremy McKinnon – background vocals
 James SK Wān – bamboo flute

Production
 Produced by Jeremy McKinnon
 Engineered by Andrew Wade, @ The Wade Studio, Ocala, Florida
 Mixed by Pete Rutcho, Southbridge, Massachusetts
 Mixing assistant: Shane Frisby
 Mastered by Alan Douches, @ West West Side, New York, NY
 Album art & design by Nick Pritchard

Charts

References

2012 albums
The Ghost Inside (band) albums
Epitaph Records albums
Albums produced by Jeremy McKinnon